Bonaventura Furlani, O.F.M. Conv. (died December 1597) was a Roman Catholic prelate who served as Bishop of Alatri (1586–1597).

Biography
Bonaventura Furlani was ordained a priest in the Order of Friars Minor Conventual.
On 5 November 1586, he was appointed during the papacy of Pope Sixtus V as Bishop of Alatri.
On 18 November 1586, he was consecrated bishop by Marco Antonio Marsilio, Archbishop of Salerno, and Francesco Rusticucci, Bishop of Fano, and Matteo Colli, Bishop of Marsi, serving as co-consecrators. 
He served as Bishop of Alatri until his death in December 1597.

References

External links and additional sources
 (for Chronology of Bishops) 
 (for Chronology of Bishops)  

16th-century Italian Roman Catholic bishops
Bishops appointed by Pope Sixtus V
1597 deaths
Conventual Franciscan bishops